Younger is an English and Scottish surname, originating from Fife and Clackmannanshire in Scotland and the Scottish/English Border, meaning the second son in a family. It is also common in Northumberland. It is also commonly an anglicized variant of the German surname “Junker” in North America. 

The following people bear the surname:

Members of the Younger family of the James-Younger Gang
Bob Younger (1853–1889), American outlaw, son of Henry Washington
Cole Younger (1844–1916), American guerrilla and outlaw, son of Henry Washington
Henry Washington Younger (1810–1862), businessman, father
Jim Younger (1848–1902), American outlaw, son of Henry Washington
John Younger (1851–1874), American outlaw, son of Henry Washington
A. P. Younger (1890–1931), American screenwriter
David Reginald Younger (1871–1900) Scottish soldier, Victoria Cross recipient 
Drake Younger (born 1984), ring name of American retired professional wrestler and current referee Drake Wuertz
Edward Younger, 3rd Viscount Younger of Leckie (1906–1997), Scottish peer
Elizabeth Younger (1699–1762), English actress and dancer
Evelle J. Younger (1918–1989), American politician
George Younger, 1st Viscount Younger of Leckie (1851–1929)
George Younger, 4th Viscount Younger of Leckie (1931–2003), Scottish peer, soldier, politician and banker
James Younger, 5th Viscount Younger of Leckie (born 1955)
Jane Younger (1863–1955), Scottish artist
J. Arthur Younger (1893–1967), American politician
Paul "Tank" Younger (1928–2001), American football halfback and executive
Rick Younger (born 1969), American performer
Robert Younger, Baron Blanesburgh (1861–1946), Scottish law lord 
Tommy Younger (1930-1984), Scottish footballer
Sam Younger (born 1951), British executive
Tony Younger (born 1980), American-Israeli basketball player in the Israeli National League
William L. Younger (1894–1977), American athlete and coach
William McEwan Younger (1905–1992), Scottish brewer and political activist